Mount Lewis is a mountain rising to  at the southwest end of Rutherford Ridge in the Saint Johns Range. A rock gable on the southwest face of the mountain provides an easily recognized landmark when viewed from southward. It was named by the Advisory Committee on Antarctic Names in 2007 after Adam R. Lewis, research assistant professor at North Dakota State University who has made significant contributions to understanding the Late Cenozoic vegetation history of the McMurdo Dry Valleys.

References

Lewis